This article is about the particular significance of the year 1845 to Wales and its people.

Incumbents

Lord Lieutenant of Anglesey – Henry Paget, 1st Marquess of Anglesey 
Lord Lieutenant of Brecknockshire – Penry Williams
Lord Lieutenant of Caernarvonshire – Peter Drummond-Burrell, 22nd Baron Willoughby de Eresby 
Lord Lieutenant of Cardiganshire – William Edward Powell
Lord Lieutenant of Carmarthenshire – George Rice, 3rd Baron Dynevor 
Lord Lieutenant of Denbighshire – Robert Myddelton Biddulph   
Lord Lieutenant of Flintshire – Robert Grosvenor, 1st Marquess of Westminster (until 17 January); Sir Stephen Glynne, 9th Baronet (from 25 April) 
Lord Lieutenant of Glamorgan – John Crichton-Stuart, 2nd Marquess of Bute 
Lord Lieutenant of Merionethshire – Edward Lloyd-Mostyn, 2nd Baron Mostyn
Lord Lieutenant of Monmouthshire – Capel Hanbury Leigh
Lord Lieutenant of Montgomeryshire – Edward Herbert, 2nd Earl of Powis
Lord Lieutenant of Pembrokeshire – Sir John Owen, 1st Baronet
Lord Lieutenant of Radnorshire – John Walsh, 1st Baron Ormathwaite

Bishop of Bangor – Christopher Bethell 
Bishop of Llandaff – Edward Copleston 
Bishop of St Asaph – William Carey 
Bishop of St Davids – Connop Thirlwall (from 9 August)

Events
1 March — Work begins on the construction of the Chester and Holyhead Railway; Robert Stephenson is chief engineer on the project.
2 August — 26 men are killed in a mining accident at Cwmbach, Aberdare.
exact date unknown
Halkyn-born Mormon missionary Dan Jones returns to Wales from the United States to proselytise for the Church of Jesus Christ of Latter-day Saints.
Henry Hussey Vivian becomes manager of the Hafod Smelting Works.

Arts and literature

Literature and new books
1 January – Lewis Edwards founds the periodical Y Traethodydd.
The Welsh language periodical Y Trysorfa is founded.
Thomas Gee inherits his father's printing business.
Daniel Evans (Daniel Ddu o Geredigion) — Galar-Cerdd ar Farwolaeth William Bruce Knight, Deon Llandaf
John Jones (Idrisyn) — Yr Esboniad Beirniadol
John Mills (Ieuan Glan Alarch) — Y Beirniadur Cymreig
Samuel Prideaux Tregelles — Hebrew Reading Lessons

Music
Rosser Beynon — Telyn Seion
Casgliad o Hymnau (hymns)
John Ambrose Lloyd — Y Ganaan Glyd

Visual arts
March — Thomas Brigstocke exhibits his painting of General Nott before Queen Victoria.
Penry Williams paints the portrait of Lady Charlotte Guest.

Births
1 January – Francis Jayne, Principal of St David's College, Lampeter, and Bishop of Chester (died 1921)
24 February – Alfred Lewis Jones, shipping magnate (died 1909)
16 May – Amy Dillwyn, businesswoman and novelist (died 1935)
21 June – Samuel Griffith, Premier of Queensland (died 1920)
10 October – Timothy Richard, missionary (died 1919)

Deaths
1 January – Sir William Nott, military leader, 62
17 January – Robert Grosvenor, 1st Marquess of Westminster, Lord Lieutenant of Flintshire, 77
26 January – Peter Jones (Pedr Fardd), poet, 69
12 April – John Nevill, 3rd Earl of Abergavenny, 55
8 August – William Bruce Knight, Dean of Llandaff, 59
16 October – Martha Llwyd, poet, 79
17 November – Sir Salusbury Pryce Humphreys, naval officer, 66

References

 
Wales